= Experience Punjab — On the Road =

2014 book by Puneetinder Kaur Sidhu

- Author: Puneetinder Kaur Sidhu
- Language: English
- Published: 2014
- Publisher: Times Group Books
- Publication place: India

Experience Punjab - On The Road is a 2014 non-fiction book written by Puneetinder Kaur Sidhu. The book was published in 2014 by Times Group Books.

== Synopsis ==
Sidhu drove through different states and cities of Punjab, India such as Amritsar, Chandigarh, Patiala, Ludhiana, and Jalandhar and wrote her experiences in this book. The book not only narrates the author's journey, bu also tells local sight-seeing details, local attractions etc. According to Sidhu: "Driving in Punjab can be a lot of fun with good roads and the fact that the distances are not much. You can travel from one end to another in around five hours".

== Publication ==
The book was first published in 2014. The book was officially inaugurated by Sohan Singh Thandal, Minister for Tourism, Government of Punjab.

== Critical reception ==
The book attracted reviewers' attention. The Times of India wrote in their review:

For a driving enthusiast, Punjab is an unparalleled destination and Experience Punjab: On The Road is a veritable guide to anyone who want to traverse the various highways and country-roads that carve the region.
